Fouad Chehab Stadium, also known as Jounieh Municipal Stadium, is a multi-use stadium in Jounieh, Lebanon. It is currently used mostly for football matches, and has a capacity of 5,000.

References

Football venues in Lebanon
Rugby union stadiums in Asia
Sports venues in Lebanon